A cantred was a subdivision of a county in Ireland in the 13th to 16th centuries.

Cantred may also refer to:

 Barony (Ireland) or cantred

See also
 Canter
 Cantref, an obsolete subdivision of a county in Wales
 Center (disambiguation)